Flypass may refer to:
Flypass, Air Malta's frequent flyer program
Flypast